Farm to Market Roads in Texas are owned and maintained by the Texas Department of Transportation (TxDOT).

FM 2300

Farm to Market Road 2300 (FM 2300) is located in Carson and Gray counties.

The southern terminus of FM 2300 is at Business I-40 in Groom in Carson County. The highway travels north along Eastern Avenue and has a junction with I-40 before leaving the town. FM 2300 continues north before turning east at County Road 168. It enters Gray County and turns back north at Ollinger Road. FM 2300 crosses FM 293 before reaching its northern terminus at US 60 southeast of Pampa.

The designation was extended to US 66 (now Business I-40) on June 28, 1963.

Junction list

FM 2301

Farm to Market Road 2301 (FM 2301) is located in Floyd, Swisher and Armstrong counties.

FM 2301 begins at an intersection with US 70 near Aiken. The highway travels in a northern direction through rural areas of Floyd County, intersecting FM 2286 and FM 788. FM 2301 enters Swisher County and turns west at County Road 27 and turns back north at an intersection with FM 1612. The highway ends at an intersection with FM 285 south of Wayside. FM 2301 travels through entirely rural areas of the South Plains and Panhandle regions and does not travel through any towns, except for the unincorporated community of Claytonville.

The highway was extended  northward and westward to FM 1612 on October 31, 1957. FM 2301 was extended northward to FM 285 on June 2, 1967; this last extension replaced parts of FM 1612 and FM 1318 and all of FM 2398.

Junction list

FM 2302

Farm to Market Road 2302 (FM 2302) is located in Coleman County.

FM 2302 begins at an intersection with SH 206 northeast of Coleman. The highway travels in an eastern direction before ending at an intersection with FM 1176.

The section of highway from Cross Roads northward to SH 206 was transferred to FM 1176 on June 26, 1967.

FM 2303

Farm to Market Road 2303 (FM 2303) is located in Erath County.

FM 2303 begins at an intersection with SH 108 just outside of the Stephenville city limits. The highway travels in a northwest direction and has an intersection with FM 3025 before ending at an intersection with FM 219.

The highway was extended  to FM 219 on June 28, 1963.

FM 2303 (1955)

The original FM 2303 was designated on January 26, 1955, from Whitewright east to Randolph. This became part of FM 1281 shortly after designation.

FM 2304

Farm to Market Road 2304 (FM 2304) is located in Travis County.

FM 2304 begins at an intersection with FM 1626 in Manchaca. The highway travels along Manchaca Road and passes near several subdivisions in southern Austin before state maintenance ends at an intersection with Matthews Lane just south of William Cannon Drive.

The route was redesignated Urban Road 2304 (UR 2304) on June 27, 1995. The designation reverted to FM 2304 with the elimination of the Urban Road system on November 15, 2018.

FM 2304 (1955)

The first FM 2304 was designated from SH 95 at Cistern, southwest to the Gonzales county line. This FM 2304 became part of an extended FM 1115 in September or October 1955.

FM 2304 (1956)

The highway was extended  to the Neches River later that year on November 21. The road was extended west of FM 92 at Spurger on October 31, 1958. The highway was cancelled on December 1, 1958, with the mileage being transferred to FM 1013.

FM 2305

Farm to Market Road 2305 (FM 2305) is located in Bell County in the Killeen–Temple–Fort Hood metropolitan area.

FM 2305 begins at Belton Lake in the Woodland area. The highway enters the Temple city limits near an intersection with FM 2271 / Morgan's Point Road. FM 2305 travels through Temple along Adams Avenue and has interchanges with SH 317 and SH 36 / Loop 363 before ending at SH 53 just west of I-35.

FM 2305 was designated on July 28, 1955, along the current route. The section of highway between SH 317 and SH 53 was redesignated Urban Road 2305 (UR 2305) on June 27, 1995. The designation of that section reverted to FM 2305 with the elimination of the Urban Road system on November 15, 2018.

Junction list

FM 2306

Farm to Market Road 2306 (FM 2306) is located in Hockley County.

FM 2306 begins at an intersection with Hartford Road northwest of Levelland. The highway travels in an eastern direction and has an intersection with FM 1490 before ending at US 385.

The current FM 2306 was designated on October 31, 1957, along the current route.

FM 2306 (1955)

The highway was cancelled on December 21, 1956, with the mileage being transferred to FM 183.

FM 2307

Farm to Market Road 2307 (FM 2307) is located in Falls County.

The highway travels in a northeast direction through rural farmland and has an intersection with FM 3375. State maintenance ends at an intersection with County Road 153, with the road continuing as County Road 152.

FM 2307 was designated on July 28, 1955, along the current route.

FM 2308

Farm to Market Road 2308 (FM 2308) is located in Falls County in the city of Marlin. Running at a length of just under , FM 2308 is one of the shortest highways in Texas.

FM 2308 begins at an intersection with Bus. SH 6. The highway travels in a southeastern direction, running between two small lakes, before ending at an intersection with FM 147.

FM 2308 was designated on July 28, 1955, along the current route.

FM 2309

Farm to Market Road 2309 (FM 2309) is located in McCulloch County.

FM 2309 begins at an intersection with SH 71 southeast of Brady. The highway travels in a northwestern direction through rural areas and passes many farms before entering Brady. FM 2309 turns north onto A.L. Reed Street near Willie Washington Park then turns west onto 11th Street. The highway continues to travel along 11th Street and ends at an intersection with US 87/US 190/US 377.

The current FM 2309 was designated on April 30, 1959, along an old routing of FM 734.

FM 2309 (1955)

The highway was cancelled on November 26, 1958, with the mileage being transferred to FM 591. This portion of FM 591 was later transferred to FM 1702.

FM 2310

Farm to Market Road 2310 (FM 2310) is located in Limestone County.

FM 2310 begins at an intersection with US 84 near Lake Mexia. The highway travels in a northwestern direction through rural farm lands passes by or near the towns of Echols and Sandy. FM 2310 ends at an intersection with FM 73 near Coolidge.

FM 2310 was designated on July 28, 1955, along the current route.

FM 2311

Farm to Market Road 2311 (FM 2311) is located in McLennan County.

FM 2311 begins at an intersection with SH 31 near Axtell. The highway travels in a northwestern direction through rural farm areas near several wetlands and travels through Leroy, where it intersects FM 308. The highway turns southwest at Tours before turning northwest at an intersection with FM 3149. FM 2311 next then enters West, where it briefly travels along Oak Street before ending at an intersection with FM 2114.

The highway was extended southeastward  to its current southern terminus at SH 31 on June 28, 1963.

Junction list

FM 2312

Farm to Market Road 2312 (FM 2312) is located in Shackelford County.

FM 2312 begins at intersection with FM 576 west of Moran. The highway travels in a northern direction through rural areas before ending at an intersection with SH 6.

FM 2312 was designated on July 28, 1955, along the current route.

FM 2313

Farm to Market Road 2313 (FM 2313) is located in Lampasas County.

FM 2313 begins at an intersection with US 190 in Kempner. The highway travels out in a northeast direction and turns northwest at County Road 3300. FM 2313 turns west at County Road 3220 and crosses the Lampasas River before ending at an intersection with FM 580.

The highway was extended  northwestward and westward to FM 580 on June 27, 1960.

FM 2314

Farm to Market Road 2314 (FM 2314) is located in Lavaca County.

FM 2314 begins at an intersection with Alt. US 90 on the eastern edge of Hallettsville. The highway begins traveling in a generally northern direction before turning northeast and running through rural farm areas. State maintenance ends at County Road 138 near Vsetin.

FM 2314 was designated on July 28, 1955, along the current route.

FM 2315

FM 2316

Farm to Market Road 2316 (FM 2316) is located in El Paso County in the city of El Paso.

FM 2316 begins at I-10 near a retail center, with the road continuing past I-10 as Giles Road. The highway travels along McRae Boulevard in a suburban area of the city. FM 2316 ends at an intersection with US 62/US 180 near El Paso International Airport.

FM 2316 was designated on July 28, 1955, along the current route. The route was redesignated Urban Road 2316 (UR 2316) on June 27, 1995. The designation reverted to FM 2316 with the elimination of the Urban Road system on November 15, 2018.

RM 2317

Ranch to Market Road 2317 (RM 2317) is located in Hudspeth County.

RM 2317 runs from  US 62/US 180 near Cornudas southward and then eastward before ending at RM 1111.

RM 2317 was originally designated as Farm to Market Road 2317 (FM 2317) on July 28, 1955, from US 62 southward to Hueco Gas Pump Station. The route was redesignated RM 2317 on October 27, 1959. It was extended to the west to RM 1111 on May 2, 1962.

FM 2318

FM 2318 (Bosque County)

FM 2318 (Hudspeth County)

FM 2319

FM 2319 (1955)

The original FM 2319 was designated on September 1, 1955, from SH 121 southwest of McKinney, south and east  to new US 75, 1 mile west of Wetsel. This was formerly a portion of FM 2170 before it was rerouted to run east of US 75 (the remaining 2 miles of this section were removed altogether). FM 2319 was cancelled on September 27, 1957, in exchange for extending FM 2448 (later FM 2478).

FM 2320

FM 2320 (1955)

The original FM 2320 was designated on August 24, 1955, from Commerce, northwest  to the Fannin County line at Wolfe City. On November 21, 1956, the road was extended northwest  to Bailey. FM 2320 was cancelled (along with FM 2321) on December 5, 1958, and transferred to FM 1281 (now SH 11).

FM 2321

Farm to Market Road 2321 (FM 2321) is located in Clay County.

FM 2321 begins at the intersection of Friendship Road and Spikes Road. The highway travels in an eastern direction through rural farming and ranching areas before ending at an intersection with FM 1288 south of Bellevue.

The current FM 2321 was designated on September 20, 1961, running from FM 1288 westward to a road intersection.

FM 2321 (1955)

The original FM 2321 was designated on August 24, 1955, from US 75 near Sherman southeast  to Tom Bean. FM 2321 was cancelled (along with FM 2320) on December 5, 1958, and transferred to FM 1281 (now SH 11).

RM 2322

Ranch to Market Road 2322 (RM 2322) is a  route located in Travis County.

RM 2322 was designated on August 24, 1955, but it terminated at Lake Travis within the current boundary of Pace Bend Park; the terminus was moved to the park boundary on April 28, 1983.

RM 2322 begins at an intersection with SH 71 in west Travis County, between Bee Cave and Spicewood. It proceeds northwest along Pace Bend Road for 4.6 miles (7.4 km), following the shoreline of several branches of Lake Travis. RM 2322 passes through the village of Briarcliff before terminating at the entrance to Pace Bend Park, an LCRA-maintained park.

RM 2323

Ranch to Market Road 2323 (RM 2323) is located in Llano and Gillespie counties in the Texas Hill Country.

RM 2323 begins at an intersection with US 87 northwest of Fredericksburg. The highway travels through rural, hilly terrain for most of its length before entering Llano, where RM 2323 ends at an intersection with SH 16.

The highway was extended  southwestward to Prairie Mountain on October 31, 1958.

FM 2323 (1955)

This became part of FM 364 by 1956.

FM 2324

RM 2325

 Originally FM 2325.

FM 2326

FM 2327

FM 2328

RM 2329

Ranch to Market Road 2329 (RM 2329) is located in Henderson County.

RM 2329 begins at an intersection with FM 316 south of Eustace. The highway travels south before turning east near Cedar Creek Reservoir and an intersection with RM 3054. RM 2329 continues east before ending at US 175 in Pickens.

RM 2329 was designated on August 24, 1955, as Farm to Market Road 2329 (FM 2329), along the current route. The designation was changed to RM 2329 on October 29, 1959.

FM 2330

FM 2331

Farm to Market Road 2331 (FM 2331) is located in Johnson County.

FM 2331 begins at an intersection with US 67 southwest of Cleburne. The highway starts out traveling in a northwest direction, running through the town of Bono and turns north before beginning an overlap with FM 4. After leaving the overlap with FM 4, FM 2331 continues to run in a northern direction and starts to turn to the east at County Road 1231 before running in a more northern direction at County Road 1229. After the intersection with County Road 1229, the highway enters Godley and has an overlap with SH 171 through the town. FM 2331 leaves Godley and runs in a mostly northern direction and ends at the Tarrant county line; the road continues as Winscott Plover Road to FM 1187.

The highway was extended  to SH 171 on July 11, 1968, creating an overlap with FM 1192. FM 2331 was extended  to the Tarrant County line on December 20, 1984, replacing FM 2435; at the same time, FM 1192 became part of FM 208, which became part of FM 4 two months later.

Junction list

FM 2332

Farm to Market Road 2332 (FM 2332) is located in Clay County.

FM 2332 begins at an intersection with  SH 148 south of Petrolia. A two-lane roadway for its entire length, it travels eastward before curving to the south to intersect  FM 1197 northeast of Hurnville. Resuming an eastward direction, FM 2332 then intersects  FM 171. Near the Red River and the Oklahoma state line, the highway turns to the south; near where it crosses the Little Wichita River, the roadway is within  of Jefferson County, Oklahoma. The route parallels the Montague County line before reaching its eastern terminus at  US 82 west of Ringgold.

The current FM 2332 was designated on October 31, 1958, from its current western terminus at  SH 148 near Petrolia to  FM 1197. The route was extended to its current length on September 27, 1960, when the eastern extension of FM 1197 and the mileage of the original  FM 2535 became part of this route.

Junction list

FM 2332 (1955)

The original FM 2332 was designated on August 24, 1955, from Loop 212 in Manor south 7 miles to FM 969. FM 2332 was cancelled on May 23, 1956, and removed from the state highway system; the funds originally set aside for FM 2332 were instead used to construct RM 2244. The route became part of FM 973 on October 31, 1957.

FM 2333

FM 2334

FM 2335

FM 2336

FM 2337

RM 2337

RM 2338

Ranch to Market Road 2338 (RM 2338) is located in Williamson County. The western terminus of RM 2338 is at FM 970 in Andice. It runs along Andice Road, and in Sun City, the road name changes to Williams Drive. The eastern end of RM 2338 is at FM 3405. Past this point, the roadway continues under county maintenance.

RM 2338 was designated on August 24, 1955, as Farm to Market Road 2338 (FM 2338), running from FM 970 in Andice to US 81 in Georgetown. The designation was changed to RM 2338 on October 1, 1956. On September 25, 2008, the section of highway within the city of Georgetown was removed from the state highway system.

FM 2339

Farm to Market Road 2339 (FM 2339) is located in Van Zandt County.

FM 2339 begins at an intersection with FM 1861 south of Martin's Mill. Just east of FM 773, the highway passes near Callender Lake and a rural subdivision. FM 2339 enters Edom and ends at an intersection with FM 279.

The highway was extended  to FM 1861 on October 31, 1957.

FM 2339 (1955)

The original FM 2339 was designated on August 24, 1955, from SH 19 and FM 1861 southwest 7.9 miles to FM 316. This was cancelled on October 25, 1955, in exchange for creating the current FM 2339.

RM 2340

Ranch to Market Road 2340 (RM 2340) is located in Burnet County.

RM 2340 begins at an intersection with RM 963 northeast of Burnet. The highway travels in a generally northern direction and turns to the west in Lake Victor. RM 2340 travels in a southwestern direction from Lake Victor and ends at an intersection with US 281 roughly halfway between Burnet and Lampasas.

RM 2340 was designated on August 24, 1955, along the current route.

RM 2341

Ranch to Market Road 2341 (RM 2341) is located in Burnet County.

RM 2341 begins at an intersection with SH 29 west of Burnet. The highway travels in a generally northern direction and turns west near South Fork Morgan Creek near the northeastern point of Lake Buchanan. RM 2341 runs parallel to the lake's northern shore before ending at the main entrance to Canyon of the Eagles Nature Park.

RM 2341 was extended  northwestward on June 1, 1965.

RM 2342

Ranch to Market Road 2342 (RM 2342) is located in Burnet County.

RM 2342 begins at an intersection with RM 1431 just east of Kingsland near where the Colorado and Llano Rivers meet. The highway travels in a northeastern direction and passes by a golf course before turning in a more northern direction near Boil Spring. RM 2342 continues to run in a generally northern direction before ending at an intersection with Park Road 4 just west of Longhorn Cavern State Park.

RM 2342 was designated on August 24, 1955, along the current route.

FM 2343

Farm to Market Road 2343 (FM 2343) is located in Sabine County, mainly within the Sabine National Forest. It runs from SH 87 in the community of Yellowpine to FM 201. The roadway continues past this intersection as Scrappin Valley Drive.

FM 2343 was designated on August 24, 1955, from SH 87 at Yellowpine southwest  to a road intersection. On September 28, 1995, by district request, the road was extended southwest to what was then Forest Highway 87.

FM 2344

FM 2345

FM 2345 (1955)

The original FM 2345 ran from US 281 north of Mineral Wells east and south to US 180 in Mineral Wells. This was cancelled by 1957.

FM 2346

FM 2347

Farm to Market Road 2347 (FM 2347), known as George Bush Drive (formerly Jersey Street), is in Brazos County, running from Easterwood Airport northeastward to Business SH 6-R in College Station.  This route runs along the southern border of the Texas A&M University main campus and is the location for the George Bush Presidential Library.

FM 2347 begins at the Easterwood Airport on the campus of Texas A&M University in College Station, Brazos County, heading east on two-lane undivided George Bush Drive West. The road curves northeast and intersects FM 2818, at which point it becomes a four-lane divided highway. The highway heads through areas of fields and trees, passing to the southeast of the George Bush Presidential Library. FM 2347 continues through more of the campus, running to the southeast of the university's sports fields. After passing near Olsen Field, the road crosses a Union Pacific railroad line and crosses FM 2154. The highway becomes George Bush Drive and runs between Texas A&M University to the northwest and residential neighborhoods to the southeast. FM 2347 passes southeast of the University Golf Course and comes to its terminus at Business SH 6-R.

The current FM 2347 was designated onto its current alignment on January 31, 1967. This was the former SH 307. The route was redesignated Urban Road 2347 (UR 2347) on June 27, 1995. The designation reverted to FM 2347 with the elimination of the Urban Road system on November 15, 2018.

Junction list

FM 2347 (1955)

The original FM 2347 was designated on August 24, 1955, from US 190 (now FM 485) at Maysfield north  to a road intersection. On September 27, 1960, the road was extended northeast  to a county road near Jones Prairie and extended again on October 20, 1961, to FM 2027 at Cross Roads. FM 2347 was cancelled on August 16, 1966, and became a portion of FM 979.

FM 2348

Farm to Market Road 2348 (FM 2348) is located in Titus County.

FM 2348 begins at an intersection with SH 11 southwest of the Welsh Reservoir. The highway travels in a generally northwestern direction before turning in a more northern direction near FM 4000. FM 2348 runs just east of Mount Pleasant and intersects SH 49 before ending at an intersection with US 67 / FM 1001.

The highway was extended  southward to SH 11 on October 31, 1957. FM 2348 was extended  northward to US 67 on September 27, 2001.

Junction list

FM 2349

FM 2349 (1955)

FM 2350

FM 2350 (1955)

FM 2351

Farm to Market Road 2351 (FM 2351) is located in Harris and Galveston counties in the southwestern Greater Houston area.

FM 2351 begins at the Brazoria–Galveston county line in Friendswood; the road continues into Brazoria County through Pearland as Brazoria County Road 129. The highway travels through Friendswood as Edgewood Avenue and intersects FM 518 near the center of town. FM 2351 crosses Clear Creek and crosses into Harris County before entering Houston at an intersection with Beamer Road. In Houston, the highway travels along Clear Lake City Boulevard and intersects I-45 before ending at an intersection with SH 3.

FM 2351 was extended  northeastward to SH 3 on June 1, 1965. An extension to SH 146 at Shoreacres was proposed on December 21, 1987, but was never built. The route was redesignated Urban Road 2351 (UR 2351) on June 27, 1995. The designation reverted to FM 2351 with the elimination of the Urban Road system on November 15, 2018.

Junction list

FM 2351 (1955)

The highway was cancelled and combined with RM 1871 on December 13, 1956.

FM 2351 (1957)

The highway was cancelled and combined with FM 1062 on November 26, 1958.

FM 2352

FM 2353

Farm to Market Road 2353 (FM 2353) is located in Palo Pinto County.

FM 2353 begins at an intersection with SH 16 near the Possum Kingdom Lake dam. The highway starts out running in a western direction then turns in a slight northwest direction near the Brazos River Authority's lake office. FM 2353 travels through more scenic areas near the eastern shore of Possum Kingdom Lake, intersecting Park Road 36 about a mile south of the Possum Kingdom Airport. North of Park Road 36, the highway's route becomes less rural as it runs in close proximity to the eastern shore of the lake and runs in a slight northeast direction. FM 2353 continues to run in a northeast direction through more suburban areas of Possum Kingdom, ending at an intersection with SH 16 near Tranquility Cove.

FM 2353 (1955)

The highway was cancelled and removed from the state highway system on September 20, 1956.

FM 2354

RM 2355

FM 2355

FM 2356

FM 2356 (1955)

The original FM 2356 was designated on September 21, 1955, from FM 1058, 6 miles west of Hereford, north  to a county road. FM 2356 was cancelled on October 6, 1960, and transferred to FM 1057.

FM 2357

FM 2358

FM 2358 (1955)

FM 2359

FM 2360

FM 2361

FM 2362

FM 2363

FM 2364

FM 2365

FM 2366

Farm to Market Road 2366 (FM 2366) was located in Maverick County.

FM 2366 was cancelled on December 14, 2006, and the road was sold to Cinco 1994 Family Limited Partnership, who owns the land adjacent to FM 2366.

FM 2367

FM 2368

FM 2369

Farm to Market Road 2369 (FM 2369) is located in Uvalde County.

FM 2369 begins at an intersection with US 90 west of Uvalde. The highway travels in a northwestern direction and turns east at a county road. FM 2369 has an intersection with FM 1403 and enters Uvalde near an intersection with FM 1435. The highway travels through the northern part of the town along Front Street and crosses under US 83 before leaving the town near Camp Street. After leaving Uvalde, FM 2369 travels in a northeastern direction and intersects FM 1023 and FM 3447 before ending at US 90 northeast of Uvalde.

The highway was extended  to US 90 northeast of Uvalde on January 22, 1958, and a spur route traveling along Getty Street in Uvalde was created. This extension was formerly proposed as FM 1906. The spur route was cancelled and re-designated as Spur 144 on July 14, 1961.

Junction list

FM 2370

FM 2371

FM 2372

FM 2372 (1955)

The original FM 2372 was designated on September 21, 1955, from US 84 northwest of Progress east to FM 299 (now SH 214). This was cancelled by 1956.

FM 2373

FM 2374

FM 2374 (1955)

The original FM 2374 was designated on September 21, 1955, from FM 498, 7.3 miles east of US 277, south  to FM 1018. FM 2374 was cancelled on September 12, 1958, and transferred to FM 507.

RM 2375

FM 2376

Farm to Market Road 2376 (FM 2376) is located in Brown County in Brownwood.

FM 2376 begins at an intersection with FM 45 in southern Brownwood. The highway travels near Gordon Hayward Stadium and travels through rural parts of the city before running through an industrial area north of the FM 3064 intersection. FM 2376 travels through a residential area with state maintenance ending at an intersection with Asbury Street.

The current FM 2376 was designated on October 27, 2005, as FM 823, which also replaced the part of FM 3064 north of the east end of FM 3064. It was determined shortly before March 30, 2006, that FM 823 still existed, so the number was changed to FM 2376 on March 30, 2006.

FM 2376 (1955)

The first FM 2376 was designated on September 21, 1955, running from FM 548 eastward to the Hunt County Line. FM 2376 was cancelled on November 4, 1955, with the mileage being transferred to FM 1143 (now SH 276).

FM 2376 (1956)

The highway was extended  to FM 5 near Aledo on June 1, 1965. FM 2376 was cancelled on December 20, 1984, with the mileage being transferred to FM 1187.

FM 2377

Farm to Market Road 2377 (FM 2377) is located in Ellis County.

FM 2377 begins at an intersection with SH 342 in Red Oak. The highway travels in a southern direction along Louise Ritter Drive and turns east near Red Oak High School before running along the northern edge of Pecan Hill. FM 2377 turns southeast at Pratt Road and ends at an intersection with FM 983 near Rockett.

FM 2377 was designated on October 25, 1955, along the current route.

FM 2378

Farm to Market Road 2378 (FM 2378) is located in Lubbock County.

FM 2378 begins at an intersection with FM 1585 near Wolfforth. The highway travels in a northern direction in close proximity to the Hockley county line for its entire length. FM 2378 has major intersections with SH 114 near Reese Center, FM 2641 northwest of Lubbock and FM 1294 west of Shallowater before ending at an intersection with US 84 southeast of Roundup.

The highway was extended  northward to FM 2641 on May 7, 1970. FM 2378 was extended  northward to US 84 on September 29, 1977.

Junction list

FM 2378 (1956)

The highway was cancelled on July 26, 1963, with the mileage being transferred to FM 2123.

RM 2378 (1955)

On February 23, 1956, the highway was extended south  to Vance. The highway was cancelled on April 19, 1956, with the mileage being transferred to RM 335.

FM 2379

FM 2379 (1956)

The first use of the FM 2379 designation was in Archer County, from FM 210, 2.5 miles west of SH 25, southwest  to a road intersection. FM 2379 was cancelled on February 2, 1959, and transferred to FM 2178.

FM 2379 (1960)

The next use of the FM 2379 designation was in San Augustine County, from SH 147 near Broaddus, east  to the then proposed location of FM 705. FM 2379 was cancelled on May 3, 1961, and transferred to FM 83.

FM 2380

Farm to Market Road 2380 (FM 2380) is located in Archer and Wichita counties entirely in Wichita Falls.

FM 2380 begins at an intersection with SH 79 just south of the Archer–Wichita county line near Lakeside City. The highway travels along Kemp Boulevard near the western shore of Lake Wichita; north of the lake, FM 2380 travels near a subdivision before ending at an intersection with FM 369.

FM 2380 was designated on November 21, 1956, along the current route. The route was redesignated Urban Road 2380 (UR 2380) on June 27, 1995. The designation reverted to FM 2380 with the elimination of the Urban Road system on November 15, 2018.

RM 2381

Ranch to Market Road 2381 (RM 2381) is located in Potter County.

RM 2381 begins at I-40 in Bushland. The highway passes near a few subdivisions before having a more rural route. RM 2381 continues to run through rural areas before ending at an intersection with RM 1061.

RM 2381 was designated on October 31, 1958, along the current route.

FM 2381 (1956)

FM 2381 was designated on November 21, 1956, from FM 1919 3.8 miles north of Seymour northward . This route was cancelled on October 30, 1957, in exchange for extending FM 2069 eastward from 3 miles north of US 82 to FM 1789.

FM 2382

Farm to Market Road 2382 (FM 2382) is located in Montague and Cooke counties.

The southern terminus of FM 2382 is in Montague County, at US 82 in St. Jo. The route travels to the northeast along Evans Street before leaving the city limits.

FM 2382 was designated on November 21, 1956, along the current route. The western terminus of FM 373 was at FM 2382 from February 15, 1959, to December 20, 1988, when FM 373 was extended to FM 677.

FM 2383

FM 2384

FM 2385

FM 2386

FM 2386 (1956)

The original FM 2386 was designated on November 21, 1956, from SH 51 (now US 385) 2 miles south of Hereford, south  to the Castro County line. FM 2386 was cancelled on November 26, 1958, and transferred to FM 1305 (now FM 1055).

FM 2387

FM 2388

RM 2389

FM 2389 (1956)

A year later the road was extended west  from SH 70, and another  on November 24, 1959. FM 2389 was cancelled on February 16, 1960, and transferred to FM 281.

FM 2390

FM 2390 (1956)

The first use of the FM 2390 designation was in Randall County, from FM 285, 1.7 miles east of US 87, north  to a road intersection. On October 31, 1957, the road was extended north to SH 217, but FM 2390 was cancelled on November 29, 1957, and transferred to FM 1541.

FM 2390 (1958)

The next use of the FM 2390 designation was in Cooke County, from FM 372, 3 miles southeast of Gainesville, southeast  to a road intersection near Dye. On November 24, 1959, the road was extended southeast  to a county road. On September 27, 1960, the road was extended east  to the Grayson County line. FM 2390 was cancelled om May 11, 1964, and transferred to FM 902.

FM 2391

FM 2392

FM 2393

Farm to Market Road 2393 (FM 2393) is located in western Clay County.

FM 2393 is a two-lane road for its entire length. The route begins to the north of Lake Arrowhead and Lake Arrowhead State Park at an intersection with  FM 1954. Traveling to the east, it meets FM 1954 for the second time, as that route forms a loop to the park. Past this intersection, FM 2393 turns more to the north. It crosses  US 82/US 287 in Jolly followed by SH 79 in Dean. The route then travels in a northwesterly direction before terminating at  FM 171 in the unincorporated community of Thornberry.

The current route was designated on October 31, 1957, connecting Dean to Jolly. The northern extension from Dean to Thornberry was designated on June 21, 1967, replacing FM 2715. The southern section from Jolly to FM 1954 was added to the state highway system on November 3, 1971.

Junction list

FM 2393 (1956)

FM 2393 was originally designated on November 21, 1956, from FM 178 in Midway eastward  to a road intersection. This was cancelled in 1957.

FM 2394

FM 2394 (1956)

The first use of the FM 2394 designation was in Hale County, from FM 788 east of Finney north  to the Swisher County line. FM 2394 was cancelled on November 21, 1957, and transferred to FM 1612.

FM 2394 (1958)

The next use of the FM 2394 designation was in Potter and Randall counties, from FM 1151, 4.5 miles west of the Armstrong County line, north  to the Potter County line. On September 20, 1961, the road was extended southeast  from FM 1151. On June 1, 1965, the road was extended north  to I-40. FM 2394 was cancelled on May 12, 1966, and became a portion of FM 1258.

FM 2395

FM 2395 (1956)

The original FM 2395 was designated on November 21, 1956, from FM 597 at Anton, south and west  to Hodge School. On November 26, 1958, a  section from 9.3 miles south of FM 597 westward was transferred to FM 1294. The remainder of FM 2395 was cancelled on January 13, 1960, and transferred to FM 168.

FM 2396

FM 2397

Farm to Market Road 2397 (FM 2397) is located in Parmer and Castro counties. It runs from SH 214 south of Friona to CR 608 with a spur connection to Friona. There is a brief concurrency with FM 1057.

FM 2397 was designated on November 21, 1956, from FM 299 (now SH 214) near Friona east, south and east  to a road intersection (now FM 1172). On September 27, 1960, the road was extended east  to the Castro County line. On November 26, 1969, the road was extended  to a road intersection (now CR 608), creating a concurrency with FM 1057 as well as replacing a portion of it. On January 30, 1976, the road was extended west  to new SH 214 and a  spur connection to Spur 270 (now Business SH 214) in Friona along old SH 214 was added.

RM 2398

Ranch to Market Road 2398 (RM 2398) is located in Crockett County.

RM 2398 begins at I-10 exit 350 and runs in a generally east-southeast direction before ending at I-10 exit 363 near Ozona.

RM 2398 was designated on June 12, 1968, along its current route. The highway generally follows the former route of US 290.

Junction list

FM 2398 (1956)

The highway was extended  northward to FM 285 on October 31, 1957. The highway was cancelled and combined with FM 2301 on June 2, 1967.

FM 2399

Farm to Market Road 2399 (FM 2399) is located in Galveston County.

FM 2399 begins at an intersection with SH 6 in Hitchcock, traveling in a northern direction along Delany Road. The highway enters Texas City at a junction with I-45, with Delany Road becoming Century Boulevard. FM 2399 travels through a rural/undeveloped area of the city before ending at a junction with FM 1764.

The current FM 2399 was designated on November 19, 1970, running from FM 1764 in Texas City southward to SH 6 in Hitchcock. The route was redesignated Urban Road 2399 (UR 2399) on June 27, 1995. The designation reverted to FM 2399 with the elimination of the Urban Road system on November 15, 2018.

Junction list

FM 2399 (1956)

The first FM 2399 was designated on November 21, 1956, running from FM 1357 (now Loop 338) at Country Club Estates westward  to the intersection of 42nd Street and Grandview Avenue near Odessa. On March 29, 1962, a section from 42nd Street and Grandview Avenue east  was returned to the city of Odessa. On May 24, 1963, a second section from the western terminus east  was also turned over to the city. The remainder of FM 2399 was cancelled on June 4, 1970, and redesignated as Spur 492 (now SH 191).

Notes

References

+23
Farm to market roads 2300
Farm to Market Roads 2300